Ercoli is a surname. Notable people with the surname include:

 Amalia Ercoli Finzi (born 1937), Italian astrophysicist
 Arturo Frondizi Ercoli (1908–1995), Argentine politician and lawyer
 Ercole Ercoli, nom de guerre of Palmiro Togliatti, Italian Communist politician (1893–1964)
 Gianmarco Ercoli (born 1995), Italian professional racing driver
 Luciano Ercoli (1929–2015), Italian film director
 Pat Ercoli (born 1957), Canadian soccer player 
 Simone Ercoli (born 1979), Italian swimmer
 Simone Ercoli (tennis), Italian former tennis player

Italian-language surnames